Mersey River may mean:

the Mersey River (Tasmania) in Tasmania, Australia.
the Mersey River (Nova Scotia) in Nova Scotia, Canada.
the River Mersey in Liverpool, England.

See also 
 Mersey (disambiguation)